Time is a municipality in Rogaland county, Norway. It is located in the traditional district of Jæren. The administrative centre of the municipality is the town of Bryne. Some villages in the municipality include Kvernaland, Lyefjell, Mossige, and Undheim. Most of Time is fairly flat and it is used for agriculture. The eastern portion of the municipality is more rugged moorland.

The  municipality is the 309th largest by area out of the 356 municipalities in Norway. Time is the 66th most populous municipality in Norway with a population of 19,353.

General information

{{Historical populations
|footnote = Source: Statistics Norway.
|shading = off
|align = left
|1951|5206
|1961|6235
|1971|8124
|1981|10132
|1991|12059
|2001|13501
|2011|16450
|2020|18916
}}
The parish of "Thime" was established as a municipality on 1 January 1838 (see formannskapsdistrikt law). The municipal borders have been slightly changed twice since that time. On 1 January 1970, a small unpopulated area was moved from Time to Gjesdal municipality. Then again on 1 January 1989 another unpopulated area was transferred to Gjesdal. Both times it was to make more room for the growing village of Ålgård.

Name
The municipality (originally the parish) is named after the old Time farm ( or ), since the first Time Church was built there. The meaning of the first element is unknown but the last element is vin which means "meadow" or "pasture". Historically, the municipality name was spelled Thime, but the "h" was dropped as the Norwegian language was reformed over time.

Coat of arms
The coat of arms was granted on 23 December 1977. It shows a white or light gray northern lapwing (Vanellus vanellus) on a red background. It is shown with wings upwards to symbolize optimism.

Churches
The Church of Norway has three parishes within the municipality of Time. It is part of the Jæren prosti (deanery) in the Diocese of Stavanger.

Geography
Time is located in the district of Jæren which is mostly flat and agricultural. The river Figgjoelva marks the northern border of Time with the municipality of Sandnes. The large lake Frøylandsvatnet forms part of the border with the neighboring municipality of Klepp. The landlocked municipality also includes part of the "Høg-Jæren" ("high-Jæren") area which is not flat like the rest of the district. Høg-Jæren is more hilly, rugged, and less densely populated.

Government
All municipalities in Norway, including Time, are responsible for primary education (through 10th grade), outpatient health services, senior citizen services, unemployment and other social services, zoning, economic development, and municipal roads. The municipality is governed by a municipal council of elected representatives, which in turn elect a mayor.  The municipality falls under the Sør-Rogaland District Court and the Gulating Court of Appeal.

Municipal council
The municipal council of Time is made up of 27 representatives that are elected to four year terms. Currently, the party breakdown is as follows:

International relations

Twin towns/Sister cities
Time has sister city agreements with the following places:
  Alnwick, Northumberland, England, United Kingdom
  Älmhult, Kronoberg County, Sweden
  Lapinjärvi, Uusimaa, Finland
  Allerød, Zealand, Denmark

Notable residents

 Arne Garborg (1851–1924) a Norwegian writer, used Landsmål, now known as Nynorsk
 Ole Gabriel Kverneland (1854–1941) a ploughsmith and factory owner, founded Kverneland Group
 Peter Hognestad (1866–1931) Lutheran theologian, writer & Bishop of Bjørgvin 
 Fritz Røed (1928–2002) sculptor, famous for Sverd i fjell (English: Swords in Rock'')
 Sølve Grotmol (1939–2010) a TV presenter for the Norwegian Broadcasting Corporation
 Janove Ottesen (born 1975) musician, grew up in Bryne, front figure of Kaizers Orchestra
 Geir Zahl (born 1975) musician and guitar player of Kaizers Orchestra
 Hanne Sigbjørnsen (born 1989) a Norwegian cartoonist, blogger and nurse

Sport 
 Sissel Løchen (born 1969) a wheelchair curler, psychiatric nurse & silver medallist at the 2018 Winter Paralympics
 Alfie Haaland (born 1972) a former footballer, brought up in Bryne, with 264 club caps and 34 for Norway
 Geir André Herrem (born 1988) a Norwegian footballer with over 300 club caps
 Erling Haaland (born 2000) a Norwegian footballer currently playing for Manchester City

References

External links
 
 
 
 Municipal fact sheet from Statistics Norway 
 Jærbladet, the local newspaper 
 Pictures from Time
 Tourist information on Time

 
Municipalities of Rogaland
1838 establishments in Norway
Jæren